General Dunbar may refer to:

Charles Dunbar (British Army officer) (1919–1981), British Army major general
Claude Dunbar (1909–1971), British Army major general
Donald P. Dunbar (fl. 1980s–2010s), Wisconsin Air National Guard major general 
Sharon K.G. Dunbar (fl. 1980s–2010s), U.S. Air Force major general